Roman Hennadiovych Monaryov (born 17 January 1980) is a Ukrainian retired footballer and current manager.

Career 
Monaryov grew up in his hometown Kropyvnytskyi, where he started playing football in force of his father early.

Since 2017 Monaryov manages the squad of FC Zirka Kropyvnytskyi, with them he managed to stay in the league after the end of the season 2016/17.

Honours
 Russian Cup winner: 2002.
 Russian Premier League runner-up: 2002.
 Ukrainian Premier League bronze: 1999.

External links
  Player page on the official FC Shinnik Yaroslavl website
 
 

1980 births
Living people
Sportspeople from Kropyvnytskyi
Ukrainian footballers
Ukrainian expatriate footballers
Expatriate footballers in Russia
Expatriate footballers in Kazakhstan
FC Spartak Vladikavkaz players
FC Arsenal Kyiv players
FC CSKA Kyiv players
PFC CSKA Moscow players
FC Moscow players
FC Zhenis Astana players
FC Luch Vladivostok players
FC KAMAZ Naberezhnye Chelny players
FC Shinnik Yaroslavl players
FC Zirka Kropyvnytskyi players
FC Kryvbas Kryvyi Rih players
Ukrainian Premier League players
Russian Premier League players
FC Nizhny Novgorod (2007) players
FC Chernomorets Novorossiysk players
FC Zirka Kropyvnytskyi managers
Association football forwards
Ukrainian football managers